The 2022–23 Troy Trojans men's basketball team represents Troy University in the 2022–23 NCAA Division I men's basketball season. The Trojans, led by fourth-year head coach Scott Cross, play their home games at Trojan Arena in Troy, Alabama as members of the Sun Belt Conference.

Previous season
The Trojans finished the 2021–22 season 20–12, 10–6 in SBC play to finish in fourth place. They defeated South Alabama in the quarterfinals of the SBC Tournament before losing to Louisiana in the semifinals. They were invited to the College Basketball Invitataional where they lost to Abilene Christian in the first round.

Offseason

Departures

Incoming transfers

Recruiting classes

2022 recruiting class

2023 recruiting class

Preseason

Preseason Sun Belt Conference poll 
The Trojans were picked to finish in 10th place in the conference's preseason poll. Senior forward Zay Williams was named to the preseason All-SBC Third Team.

Roster

Schedule and results

|-
!colspan=12 style=| Non-conference regular season

|-
!colspan=12 style=| Sun Belt Conference regular season

|-
!colspan=12 style=| Sun Belt tournament

Source

References

Troy Trojans men's basketball seasons
Troy
Troy Trojans men's basketball
Troy Trojans men's basketball